Berean Christian School (BCS) is a private K-12 Christian school in Fairview Heights, Illinois, USA. The school, that was named after the Bereans, is operated as a ministry of the Edgemont Bible Church (EBC).

Established in 1972, it was accredited as a MODEL school in 1996. The school uses the Accelerated Christian Education curriculum.

References

External links
 Official site
 Edgemont Bible Church

Schools in St. Clair County, Illinois
Educational institutions established in 1972
1972 establishments in Illinois
Private middle schools in Illinois
Private elementary schools in Illinois
Private high schools in Illinois
Christian schools in Illinois